Gaiarine is a comune (municipality) in the Province of Treviso in the Italian region Veneto, about  north of Venice and about  northeast of Treviso.

Gaiarine borders these municipalities: Brugnera, Codogné, Cordignano, Fontanelle, Godega di Sant'Urbano, Mansuè, Orsago, Portobuffolé, Sacile. Its hamlets are Francenigo, Albina, Campomolino and Calderano.

References

Cities and towns in Veneto